Nahmint Lake is a  lake located on Vancouver Island south of Sproat Lake, north east of Hucuktlis Lake.

References

Alberni Valley
Lakes of Vancouver Island
Clayoquot Land District